The 1970–71 Scottish Inter-District Championship was a rugby union competition for Scotland's district teams.

This season saw the 18th Scottish Inter-District Championship.

South won the competition with 3 wins.

1970-71 League Table

Results

Round 1

South: 

Glasgow District:

Round 2

 Edinburgh District: 

North and Midlands:

Round 3

South:

North and Midlands:

Round 4

Glasgow District: 

Edinburgh District:

Round 5

South: 

Edinburgh District:

Round 6

Glasgow District: 

North and Midlands:

Matches outwith the Championship

Other Scottish matches

Edinburgh District: 

Anglo-Scots:

Trial matches

English matches

International matches

References

1970–71 in Scottish rugby union
Scottish Inter-District Championship seasons